Pule Fransis Maraisane (born 3 January 1995) is a South African soccer player who plays as a midfielder, winger, or attacker for Cape Town All Stars.

Career

As a youth player, Maraisane joined the youth academy of Brazilian side Fluminense.

Before the second half of 2013/14, he signed for Tourizense in the Portuguese third division, where he suffered an injury.

In 2015, he signed for Swedish club GAIS.

In 2016, Maraisane signed for Lefke in Northern Cyprus.

Before the second half of 2016/17, he signed for South African outfit Mthatha Bucks.

In 2018, he signed for 1911 Çerkezköyspor in the Turkish fifth division.

In 2019, Maraisane almost signed for Orlando Pirates, one of South Africa's most successful teams.
In 2021 he signed for Mamelodi Sundowns

References

External links
 
 Pule Maraisane at playmakerstats.com

Living people
Expatriate footballers in Turkey
GAIS players
Superettan players
G.D. Tourizense players
Campeonato de Portugal (league) players
National First Division players
Mthatha Bucks F.C. players
Association football forwards
Association football midfielders
Cape Town All Stars players
Expatriate footballers in Sweden
Expatriate footballers in Portugal
Association football wingers
1995 births
South African expatriate sportspeople in Turkey
South African expatriate sportspeople in Portugal
South African expatriate sportspeople in Sweden
South African expatriate soccer players
South African soccer players
South Africa youth international soccer players